The following highways are numbered 291:

Canada
Manitoba Provincial Road 291
 Quebec Route 291

Japan
 Japan National Route 291

United States
  Interstate 291 (multiple highways)
  Alabama State Route 291
  Arkansas Highway 291
  Colorado State Highway 291
  Florida State Road 291
  Georgia State Route 291 (former)
  Kentucky Route 291
  Maryland Route 291
  Minnesota State Highway 291
  Missouri Route 291
  Montana Secondary Highway 291 (former)
  Nevada State Route 291 (former designation for Nevada State Route 140)
  New Mexico State Road 291
  New York State Route 291
 New York State Route 291 (former)
  Ohio State Route 291
  Pennsylvania Route 291
  South Carolina Highway 291
  Tennessee State Route 291
 Texas:
  Texas State Highway 291 (former)
  Texas State Highway Loop 291
  Farm to Market Road 291
  Utah State Route 291
  Washington State Route 291
  Wyoming Highway 291